Trabutiella is a genus of fungi in the family Phyllachoraceae. 

The genus was circumscribed by Frank Lincoln Stevens in Bot. Gaz. vol.70 on page 401 in 1920.

The genus name of Trabutiella is in honour of Louis Charles Trabut (1853–1929), who was a French botanist and physician. He is remembered for his work involving the flora of Algeria and Tunisia. 

It is similar in form to Trabutia (another Phyllachoraceae fungi), but with the asci 16-spored.

It was thought to be a synonym of Diatractium, but only one species had been transferred.

Species
As accepted by Species Fungorum;
 Trabutiella ichnanthi 
 Trabutiella macrospora 
 Trabutiella microthyrioides 

Former species;
 T. congregata  = Parastigmatea congregata, Polystomellaceae
 T. cordiae  = Diatractium cordianum, Phyllachoraceae
 T. diazii  = Phyllachora conica, Phyllachoraceae
 T. filicina  = Phyllachora filicina, Phyllachoraceae

References

Phyllachorales
Sordariomycetes genera